Martin MacDonald (born ca 1977) is a Canadian conductor.

Early life 
He was born on Cape Breton Island, Nova Scotia, MacDonald is the youngest of 12 children, and started to play cello when he was six years old.  He participated in the family's Celtic music band.  He studied cello at Memorial University of Newfoundland and earned a master's degree in conducting at McGill University.

Career 
When he graduated he was hired at National Academy Orchestra of Canada and in 2008 he took a job as Associate Conductor for Symphony Nova Scotia.

He has guest conducted for Hamilton Philharmonic, Thunder Bay Symphony, Orchestra London and the Windsor Symphony, and the National Arts Centre Orchestra.

Awards 
In 2010, MacDonald was awarded the Jean-Marie Beaudet Award in Orchestral Conducting awarded by the Canada Council for the Arts and in 2013 he won the Heinz Unger Award awarded by the Ontario Arts Council.

References

External links
 Profile at Symphony Nova Scotia

1977 births
Male conductors (music)
Memorial University of Newfoundland alumni
McGill University School of Music alumni
Living people
Place of birth missing (living people)
Musicians from Nova Scotia
21st-century Canadian conductors (music)
21st-century Canadian male musicians